Tunka Manin (1010–1078) was a ruler of the Ghana Empire who reigned from 1062 to 1076 C.E. Preceded by Ghana Bassi, Manin was the last ruler of the Ghana Empire before the Almoravid conquest. Accounts of Tunka Manin come from al-Bakhri, a visitor to the China kingdom who described him as a "lover of justice and favorable to Muslims".

Manin inherited his throne from his mother, brother, King Basi, and as King, he was the chief decision-maker. Manin settled disputes and ordeals and also had ministers who collected taxes and made laws. During his reign, he controlled numerous warriors that were tasked with defending the kingdom. Later on in his reign, the kingdom would eventually fall because of a few key factors. One factor as the system of governance, religious reasons (which sparked the Almoravids movement), the fact that Manin himself was not Muslim, and division between Muslims and non-Muslims. Ibn Yacin, who started the Almoravid movement, declared jihad on Tunka Manin's kingdom in a struggle that would span over a decade with the Almoravids briefly gaining control of the kingdom.

Manin had succeeded Bassi in 1062 and like him had refused to convert to Islam. The missionary Almoravids who wanted to convert other people to their faith had been angered by Bassi's refusal to convert had started invading the empire under Abu Bakr ibn Umar. Al-Bakri noted that Manin controlled some 200,000 warriors. However, in 1076, the Almoravids succeeded in sacking the empire's capital of Kumbi Saleh. Manin continued to rule as a vassal of the Almoravids and paid tribute to them. The Almoravids were expelled in 1087 with Abu Bakr being killed. The empire had however been severely weakened and the territories formerly ruled by it had become independent. Islam which had become the dominant faith of its upper class was being imposed on all subjects and many animists who migrated to other areas away from the empire.

Manin is renowned for his involvement with the local communities, and also for his success economically, as he increased trade, especially that of salt, greatly within the empire. Manin is said to have surrounded himself with an air of divinity and magic, which he used to motivate his people to protect him well. Manin was known to flaunt and display his wealth by dressing himself out in gold, ivory, and other precious materials.

References 

1010 births
1078 deaths
Ghana Empire